Milton Jeffery Barney Jr. is a baseball coach and former infielder, who is the current head baseball coach of the Mississippi Valley State Delta Devils. He played college baseball at Southern in 2007 and Grambling State from 2008 to 2010.

Playing career
Barney grew up in Gulfport, Mississippi, where he attended Gulfport High School, where he was a letterwinner for the Admirals in baseball and football. Barney attended Southern University following high school, where he appeared in 20 games for the Jaguars, registering 12 hits while driving in 10 RBI. He would transfer to Grambling State, where he would finish out his career.

Coaching career
Barney began his coaching career as an assistant coach for the Alcorn State Braves, helping the team win the 2011 Southwestern Athletic Conference title.

On August 11, 2022, Barney was named the head baseball coach of the Mississippi Valley State Delta Devils.

Head coaching record

Personal life
He is the son of former National Football League (NFL) and Arena Football League wide receiver, Milton Barney and the grandson of NFL Hall of Famer, Lem Barney.

References

External links
Grambling State Tigers bio

1988 births
Living people
Alcorn State Braves baseball coaches
Grambling State Tigers baseball players
Mississippi Valley State Delta Devils baseball coaches
Southern Jaguars baseball players
African-American baseball coaches
Sportspeople from Gulfport, Mississippi
Baseball coaches from Mississippi